Daniel Whyte may refer to:

 Daniel Whyte III (born 1960), minister and Christian writer
 Daniel Whyte (American football), American football player
 Daniel Whyte (soccer), Canadian-born Guyanese soccer player

See also
Daniel White (disambiguation)